Bournville (Mon) Halt railway station was a station which served Ty'r-Cecil near Blaina Abertillery in the Welsh county of Monmouthshire.

History
The halt was opened by the Great Western Railway in July 1897 as an untimetabled station known as Tylers Arms Platform for the use of miners. The name was taken from the public house situated just to the north. It became part of the Great Western Railway in 1880 and remained there at the Grouping of 1923.

The station was situated to the east of South Griffith Colliery and just to the west of a Baptist Chapel; it is known to have been in use by miners on 3 June 1915. It was opened to the public and renamed Bournville (Mon) on 30 October 1933, with the suffix halt being added by 5 October 1942. Passenger services were withdrawn from the station on 30 April 1962. The line through the station was singled in 1964. Official closure of the section between Blaina and Rose Heyworth Colliery including Bournville came on 5 July 1976.

Present
The A467 road follows the course of the former line through Bournville.

References

Notes

Sources

Disused railway stations in Blaenau Gwent
Former Great Western Railway stations
Railway stations in Great Britain opened in 1897
Railway stations in Great Britain closed in 1962
1897 establishments in Wales
1976 disestablishments in Wales